The Autonomous University of Coahuila (Universidad Autónoma de Coahuila, or "UAdeC") is a state university founded in 1957. It is located in the northern Mexican state of Coahuila. The university system has three campuses — Saltillo, Torreón, and Norte — distributed among the most populated cities in the state. It perhaps the only one university in the world which is governed by a President elected for a period of 3 years by direct general balloting by the unqualified vote of both students and teachers.

Campuses
The university's administrative headquarters are located on the Saltillo campus. The city's reputation for learning dates back to Colonial times and this tradition continues to be true today. Saltillo, the state capital, is only a 50-minute drive from the metropolitan city of Monterrey. Although highly industrialized, Saltillo offers a variety of cultural attractions, such as the Plaza de Armas, the Government Palace, the Cathedral de Santiago, and several interesting museums.

Another of the campuses is located in the city of Torreón. The area is hot and dry and includes the nearby desert oasis called Dunas de Viesca and Parras de la Fuente. Torreón is well known for its cotton crop and milk production.

The Campus Norte is situated mainly in the city of Monclova. The region is one of the main domestic producers of coal. Nearby attractions include Xochipoli Park, the Don Martin Dam and the Bisagra Turtle Reserve.

The Piedras Negras Campus is located near the government palace and the city's main square, the¨Macro Plaza¨.

The university also has an inter-institutional agreement with the Universidad Mexico Americana del Norte in Reynosa, Tamaulipas to offer its Doctor of Business Administration degree at the border city.

Majors
Undergraduate
Accounting
Architecture
Art
Biochemistry
Biology
Business Administration
Chemistry
Civil
Communications and Electronics
Computer Administration
Computer Engineering
Economics
Education
Electrical
Finances
Fiscal Administration
Graphic Design
Health Sciences
History
Human Relations
Human Resources
Industrial
Law
Marketing
Math
Mechanical
Merchandising
Metallurgy and Materials
Mineral and Energy Resources
Music
Musical Education
Physics
Political Sciences and Public Administration
Production
Psychology
Social Work
Sociology
Software
Spanish Literature

Graduate
Anesthesiology
Biocatalysts
Biotechnology
Chemistry Science and Technology
Clinical Pharmacology
Construction
Corporate Health, Safety and Ecology
Dentistry
Electronics
Emergencies
Enzymes
Family Medicine
Finances
Fiscal Administration
Food Science and Technology
General Surgery
Geriatrics
Global Business
Gynecology and Obstetrics
Health Research
Human Capital
Information Technology
Integral Medicine
Internal Medicine
Law
Marketing
Math Education
Mechanical
Ophthalmology
Pediatrics
Planning (Economics/Architecture)
Projects Administration (Architecture)
Projects Formulation and Evaluation
Radiology
Radiology
Real Estate Valuation
Regional Development
Research
Social Development
Taxes
Trauma
Upper Level Corporate Management
Water Management
Work Medicine

Students & Facilities

Total Enrollment: 30,269
Undergraduates: 29,157
Graduates: 1,112
Total Faculty: 2,270
Full-time Faculty: 588
Library Facilities: 55
Library Volumes: 374,429
Cafeterias:
Student Computing Centers: 45
Average Students/Computer:
Photocopy Facilities: 30
Campus Bookstores: 31

Extracurricular activities
Folkloric dance
Guided tours
Intercollegiate sports
Music
Musical groups
Radio/television
Small business groups
Social service groups
Social services
Student government/student council
Student newspaper
Travel groups

Description of the local area

The state capital of Saltillo, founded in 1577, is the oldest city in northern Mexico. Located at an elevation of 5,245 feet (1,614 m),
this city of almost 500,000 people enjoys a mild, dry climate. Saltillo's wool, silk and cotton mills are the sources of the brightly colored "sarapes" for which the city is famous.

Torreón is located in the southwest corner of the state in an area known as La Laguna that comprises an area of the neighbor State of Durango. With nearly half a million inhabitants, it is the center of a metropolitan area of more than one million inhabitants. Since it is part of the desert region of northern Mexico, Torreón has a dry climate and hot temperatures. Torreón hosts more than 30 universities, both public and private.
As host to one of the largest producers of milk in the country, the city has become a key industrial zone.

Monclova is home to the Campus Norte. It has a population of 178,606 and boasts one of the most important iron and steel foundries in the country.

The city is a dynamic urban and economic hub of the region and the source of industrial development in the area of mining and metallurgy.

Attractions include the 17th century Church of San Francisco
and the Parroquia de Santiago, as well as the collections of the Harold R. Pape and the Polvoron Museums.

Campus Description

In order to meet the demand for higher education in the state of Coahuila, UAdeC has three campuses located throughout the state. The campus in Saltillo comprises 24 schools, the Torreón campus has 17 schools and the Campus Norte in Monclova has 10 schools.

Students have access to computers connected to the Internet and all the university centers have cafeterias, a library and sports facilities.

References

External links
website

Autonomous University of Coahuila
1957 establishments in Mexico
Educational institutions established in 1957